The Moei River, also known as the Thaungyin River is a tributary of the Salween River. Unlike most rivers in Thailand, the Moei River flows north in a northwest direction. It originates in Phop Phra District, Tak Province, flowing then from south to north across Mae Sot, Mae Ramat, and Tha Song Yang Districts, finally entering the Salween River within the limits of Sop Moei District of Mae Hong Son Province.

The Yuam River joins its left bank only  before its confluence with the Salween. Many fish species inhabit its waters, including the giant river catfish.

International border
The Moei River forms a portion of the border between Thailand and Myanmar.

The river is the scene of clashes between the Tatmadaw and Karen militias. Often Karen people cross the river either in order to enter Thailand as refugees or to go back to Burma.

References

External links 
Mae Sot hit by floods as Moei bursts it banks
'Tear of Moei River' - Karen Movie

Moei
Moei
International rivers of Asia
Myanmar–Thailand border
Salween River
Border rivers